Simon Denny may refer to:

Simon Denny (artist) (born 1982), New Zealand-born artist
Simon Denny (professor), English academic
Simon Baker (born 1969), Australian-American actor known earlier in his life as Simon Baker-Denny